José Martínez Grifell (9 March 1905 – 13 November 1955), best known as Pepe Martínez, was a Mexican actor who appeared as a supporting actor in several films during the Golden Age of Mexican cinema. He was the son of actress Prudencia Grifell.

Selected filmography
Gold and Silver (1934)
Malditas sean las mujeres (1936)
Por mis pistolas (1938)
La Valentina (1938)
The Cemetery of the Eagles (1939)
Caminito alegre (1944)
Camino de Sacramento (1945)
Que Dios me perdone (1948)
The Flesh Commands (1948)
Corner Stop (1948)
The Genius (1948)
Los viejos somos así (1948)
Negra consentida (1949)
The Magician (1949)
Dos pesos dejada (1949)
Angels of the Arrabal (1949)
The Doorman (1950)
Over the Waves (1950)
María Montecristo (1951)
They Say I'm a Communist (1951)
Women Without Tomorrow (1951)
Full Speed Ahead (1951)
Sacrificed Women (1952)
Forbidden Fruit (1953)
The Unfaithful (1953)
The Three Elenas (1954)
Take Me in Your Arms (1954)

References

Bibliography
García Riera, Emilio. Historia documental del cine mexicano: 1945. Ediciones Era, 1969.

External links

1905 births
1955 deaths
Male actors from Mexico City
Mexican male film actors
20th-century Mexican male actors